Thirteen Steps Down is a 2012 two part television thriller based on the 2004 novel by Ruth Rendell first broadcast by ITV.

Plot
Mix Cellini is a lonely, maladjusted young man who works for a company that repairs exercise equipment, and lives in the upstairs apartment of an old Victorian house on Notting Hill. While his reclusive landlady, Gwendolen, spends her time reading and pondering lost loves, Mix grows dangerously obsessed with serial killer John Christie and a local model, Nerissa Nash, despite the fact that she hardly even acknowledges his existence.

Production
Set in London's Notting Hill and the nearby home of John Christie at 10 Rillington Place filming took place over five weeks in London and Dublin.

Cast and characters

Luke Treadaway as Mix Cellini
Geraldine James as Gwendolen
Elarica Gallacher as Nerissa Nash
Gemma Jones as Olive
Anna Calder-Marshall as Queenie
Victoria Bewick as Danila
Sam O'Mahony as Darel
Maryam d'Abo as Madame Odette
Laura Pyper as Kayleigh
Ben Shafik as Abbas
Brian Bovell as Tom
Carrie Crowley as Hazel
Melanie Gray as Colette

References

http://www.guardian.co.uk/tv-and-radio/2012/aug/13/tv-review-ruth-rendells-thirteen-steps-down
http://www.telegraph.co.uk/culture/tvandradio/9474881/Thirteen-Steps-Down-ITV1-review.html
http://www.theartsdesk.com/tv/ruth-rendells-thirteen-steps-down-itv1

External links

2012 British television series debuts
2012 British television series endings
2010s British crime television series
2010s British drama television series
British crime drama television series
ITV mystery shows
2010s British television miniseries
English-language television shows
Television shows based on British novels
Television series by Endemol
Television shows set in London
Television shows set in the Republic of Ireland